is a group of late Kofun period burial mounds located in the Matsushiro neighborhood of the city of Nagano in the Chubu region of Japan. The site was collectively designated a National Historic Site of Japan in 1997.

Overview
The Ōmuro Kofun Group is a large necropolis consisting of over 500 tumuli spread across two valleys on the south side of the Chikuma River at an elevation of 350 to 500 meters approximately six kilometers southeast of Nagano city. The tombs were built over a 250-year period from the 5th to the 8th centuries. They have been grouped by archaeologists into five groups ( Kanaiyama, Kitatani, Kajo, Omurodani, and Kitayama) by their geographic location, stretching across an area of roughly 2.5 square kilometers. 

There is only one keyhole-shaped kofun, but at least 330 smaller circular-shaped kofun made of stacked river stones from the Chikuma River. Most of these circular-shaped kofun have a diameter of approximately ten meters, and there is no other burial mound cluster in Japan where there are so many such circular-shaped kofun in such a small area. These mounds can be divided into 40 different variations, some with a scallop-shaped stone burial chamber, or with a triangular gabled burial chamber ceiling. Theories that these tombs were built by immigrants to Japan from the ancient Korean states of Goguryeo or Baekje remain controversial. Excavated grave goods include Sue ware and Haji ware pottery, bronze mirrors, armor, swords, horse fittings and jewelry. The number of horse bones found was unusually large, and included the skull of a horse which was buried in the vestibule of one of the horizontal burial chambers. 

The site is now an archaeological park with a museum, the  displaying some of the artifacts discovered.

Access
By car, 15 minutes from the Nagano IC on the Jōshin-etsu Expressway
From JR East Nagano Station, take the Nagaden Bus, No. 8, the Suzaka-Yashima Line, departing from the south exit of Nagano Station.

Gallery

See also
List of Historic Sites of Japan (Nagano)

References

External links

Nagano city cultural heritage database 
Matsushiro tourist information site 
Nagano city home page 

Kofun
History of Nagano Prefecture
Nagano (city)
Historic Sites of Japan